Erichsens Gård  is a timber-framed building  located at Rønne on Bornholm, Denmark. It is now part of the Bornholm Museum and is Rønne's best preserved commoner's house.

History
Erichsens Gård was built in 1806 and expanded in the 1830s and 1840s.  Surveyor and architect Henning Pedersen, who designed  Rønne Præstegård  and the old city hall on Rønne's Store Torv, lived there between 1816 and 1837.

Erichsens Gård is named after the next owner,  Thomas Erichsen (1806-1886). He moved to Bornholm in 1832 and bought this house in 1838 and married  Michelle Kathrine Westh (1812- 1890) in the same year. They had 12 children, one of whom,  Vilhelmine Charlotte Erichsen (1852–1935), became the muse of artists Kristian Zahrtmann (1843-1917) and Holger Drachmann (1846-1908). Zahrtmann painted her when she was fourteen years old. This painting is part of the Bornholms Kunstmuseum's collection. In 1871 Vilhemine married  Holger Drachmann in Gentofte church. Erichsens Gård still houses much of the memories from these artists as well as an exhibition about the Erichsen family.

Erichsens Gård became protected in 1919. It was sold in 1950  by Elena Erichsen to the Bornholm Museum.

References

Other Sources 
 Knudsen, Ann Vibeke (1990) Erichsens Gård i Rønne - Publisher: Bornholms Museum - Rønne -  - Retrieved: 22. August 2011

External links
Bornholm Museum website

Museums in Bornholm
Historic house museums in Denmark
Listed buildings and structures in Bornholm
Houses completed in 1806
Timber framed buildings in Denmark